Lawrence De Graff (June 24, 1871 – June 7, 1934) was a justice of the Iowa Supreme Court from January 1, 1921, to December 31, 1932, appointed from Polk County, Iowa.

References

Justices of the Iowa Supreme Court
1871 births
1934 deaths